William Steele (born 7 March 1946) is a South African former cricketer. He played in sixteen first-class matches for Border from 1966/67 to 1970/71.

See also
 List of Border representative cricketers

References

External links
 

1946 births
Living people
South African cricketers
Border cricketers
People from Queenstown, South Africa
Cricketers from the Eastern Cape